Guillem Molina Gutiérrez (born 3 May 2000) is a Spanish professional footballer who plays as a central defender for CE Sabadell FC.

Club career
Born in Valls, Tarragona, Catalonia, Molina joined Valencia CF's youth setup in 2014, from CF Reus Deportiu. He made his senior debut with the reserves on 25 August 2018, starting in a 2–0 Segunda División B home win against CD Ebro.

Molina scored his first senior goal on 9 February 2020, netting his team's first in a 2–2 home draw against UE Olot. On 17 July, he renewed his contract until 2023.

Molina made his first team debut on 16 December 2020, starting and being sent off in a 4–2 away win against Terrassa FC, for the season's Copa del Rey. His La Liga debut occurred on six days later, after coming on as a first-half susbtitute for Gabriel Paulista in a 0–1 home loss against Sevilla FC.

On 11 August 2021, Molina signed for CE Sabadell FC in Primera División RFEF.

Career statistics

Club

References

External links

1998 births
Living people
People from Valls
Sportspeople from the Province of Tarragona
Spanish footballers
Footballers from Catalonia
Association football defenders
La Liga players
Segunda División B players
Valencia CF Mestalla footballers
Valencia CF players
CE Sabadell FC footballers